Alfredo Antoniozzi (born 18 March 1956 in Cosenza)
is an Italian politician and was a
Member of the European Parliament
for Central
with the Forza Italia, part of the European People's Party and sat on
the European Parliament's Committee on Civil Liberties, Justice and Home Affairs.

He was a substitute for the Committee on Regional Development, a member of the
Delegation for relations with the countries of Central America and a substitute for the
Delegation to the EU-Mexico Joint Parliamentary Committee.

Education
 1980: Graduate in law
 1981: started legal practice
 Coordinator of Forza Italia for the Provincial Council of Rome
 Rome City Council
 Lazio Region
 Re-elected member of the Regional Council in 1995 and in 2000 for Forza Italia

Career
 1995-1999: Member of the Bureau
 2004: Group leader of Forza Italia until July
 Member of the Bureau of Forza Italia
 Forza Italia Coordinator for the Province of Rome

See also
 2004 European Parliament election in Italy

External links
 
 

1956 births
Living people
People from Cosenza
MEPs for Italy 2009–2014
The People of Freedom MEPs
Forza Italia MEPs
MEPs for Italy 2004–2009
21st-century Italian politicians